Blaze TV may refer to:

Blaze Media, an American TV channel
Blaze (TV channel), a British TV channel